Long Dick Creek is a stream in Hamilton and Story counties, Iowa, in the United States. It is a tributary of the Skunk River.

Long Dick Creek was named after one tall man named Richard "Long Dick", an early settler. The first schoolhouse in Story County was established near Long Dick Creek, in 1855.

See also
Big Dick Creek
List of rivers of Iowa
Unusual place names

References

Rivers of Story County, Iowa
Rivers of Iowa